The name AirCare can refer to:
 AirCare (emissions program), an emissions control program in British Columbia, Canada
 AirCare (medevac system), an air ambulance system in the United States
 AirCare.rentals (rental platform), a rental platform for house owners and property managers